The 2008 NCAA Division I baseball season, play of college baseball in the United States organized by the National Collegiate Athletic Association (NCAA) at the Division I level, began on February 22, 2008.  The season was the first to have a uniform start date for both southern and northern teams.  The change from previous seasons, in which weather allowed southern teams to begin play weeks before northern teams, was an attempt to improve parity between warm-weather and cold-weather teams.  The season progressed through the regular season, many conference tournaments and championship series, and concluded with the 2008 NCAA Division I baseball tournament and 2008 College World Series.  The College World Series, which consisted of the eight remaining teams in the NCAA tournament, was held in its annual location of Omaha, Nebraska, at Rosenblatt Stadium.  It concluded on June 25, 2008, with the final game of the best of three championship series.  Fresno State defeated Georgia two games to one to claim their first championship.  Fresno State was the first team seeded fourth in its regional tournament to win a national championship since the NCAA Tournament adopted the current 64-team format in 1999.

Realignment

New programs
Five new programs joined Division I baseball for the 2008 season, four from the NCAA Division II.  Florida Gulf Coast, previously a Division II independent; North Carolina Central, previously of the Division II Central Intercollegiate Athletic Association; Presbyterian, previously of the Division II South Atlantic Conference; and South Carolina Upstate, previously of the Division II Peach Belt Conference, all made the transition to Division I.  The fifth new program, Houston Baptist, joined Division I from the NAIA.

Conference changes

Entering the 2008 baseball season, the Mid-Continent Conference was renamed The Summit League.  The renamed conference was one of several conferences to make membership changes.

Both the renamed Summit League and the Atlantic Sun Conference added multiple members.  The Summit added three schools, IPFW, North Dakota State, and South Dakota State, all previously Division I independents.  The Atlantic Sun added two schools, Florida Gulf Coast and South Carolina Upstate, both from Division II.

Both the Big West Conference, which added UC Davis from the Division I independent ranks, and the Horizon League, which added Valparaiso from the Mid-Continent, added a single member.

Three schools joined the Division I independent ranks.  Le Moyne left the Metro Atlantic Athletic Conference to become an independent, and both North Carolina Central and Presbyterian became independents after their transitions from Division II.

Conference standings

College World Series

The 2008 season marked the sixty second NCAA Baseball Tournament, which culminated with the eight team College World Series.  The College World Series was held in Omaha, Nebraska.  The eight teams played a double-elimination format, with Fresno State claiming their first championship with a two games to one series win over Georgia in the final.

Bracket

Award winners

All-America team

References

2008 Division I Standings at BoydsWorld.com
Warrennolan Standings